Achinduich (Gaelic: Achadh an Dabhaich) is a hamlet on the east bank of the River Shin in the Scottish Highlands about 4 miles south of Lairg, Sutherland. It is in the Highland Council area.

References

Populated places in Sutherland